Falls City is a city and county seat of Richardson County, Nebraska, United States. The population was 4,133 at the 2020 census, down from 4,325 in 2010 and 4,671 in 2000.

History
Falls City was founded in the summer of 1857 by James Lane, John Burbank, J.E. Burbank, and Isaac L. Hamby. The town is located on the north side of the Big Nemaha River, in the southeast corner of the state. The river in 1857 had banks and bed of rock and stone. The town was located near where the river flowed over a four-foot (1.3 m) rock ledge called the "Falls of Nemaha", for which the town was named. Over time the river has changed to the extent that the falls no longer exist.

The town was a stop on the Underground Railroad for escaping slaves during the struggles resulting from the Kansas–Nebraska Act. Early in the city's history, it won a prolonged process to become the county seat of Richardson County. The county originally selected Salem, Nebraska to be the county seat, but due to Salem's lack of a suitable building site, a new election was held which Falls City tied in the vote. Finally in a third election in 1860, Falls City was declared the permanent site of the county seat.

Falls City grew in the late 19th century due to the arrival of the Atchison & Nebraska Railroad in 1871 and the Missouri Pacific in 1882, for which Falls City was designated as a division point in 1909. The population of the city peaked at 6,200 citizens in 1950.

In the summer of 1966, Braniff Airlines Flight 250 crashed near Falls City due to bad weather, killing all 42 on board. The BAC One-Eleven aircraft was on the Kansas City to Omaha leg of a multi-stop flight from New Orleans to Minneapolis on Saturday night, August 6.

In 1993, Brandon Teena, a trans man who had recently arrived in Falls City, was murdered by two acquaintances who, upon discovering that he had been assigned female at birth, had beaten and raped him about a week previously. Brandon had reported the rape to the police, but the Richardson County sheriff had failed to take steps to protect him; in particular, he had not arrested the two alleged rapists. Learning that the rape had been reported, the two tracked Brandon to a farmhouse near Humboldt, where they killed him and two others. Brandon's mother subsequently sued the sheriff and the county for negligence, wrongful death, and intentional infliction of emotional distress. Briefs were filed in the case by thirty-four civil-rights groups, including the Lambda Legal Defense and Education Fund; the matter eventually came before the Nebraska Supreme Court, which found the county negligent in failing to protect Brandon. The episode was dramatized in a 1999 film titled Boys Don't Cry; actor Hilary Swank received an Academy Award for Best Actress for her portrayal of Brandon.

Geography

Major highways
The major highways through the city are U.S. Highway 73 running north and south through the city, U.S. Highway 159 running east toward the Rulo bridge (and connecting to the state of Missouri), and Nebraska Highway 8 running west toward Salem, Nebraska and continuing along the southern border of Nebraska. Other state highways provide connections between smaller towns in Richardson County, Nebraska.

Climate 

Under the Köppen climate classification, Falls City is categorized as having a hot summer humid continental climate (Dfa).

Demographics

2010 census
As of the census of 2010, there were 4,325 people, 1,931 households, and 1,127 families living in the city. The racial makeup of the city was 93.1% White, 0.3% African American, 3.2% Native American, 0.5% Asian, 0.5% from other races, and 2.5% from two or more races. Hispanic or Latino of any race were 1.5% of the population.

There were 1,931 households, of which 27.1% had children under the age of 18 living with them, 44.0% were married couples living together, 10.9% had a female householder with no husband present, 3.4% had a male householder with no wife present, and 41.6% were non-families. 36.8% of all households were made up of individuals, and 19.5% had someone living alone who was 65 years of age or older. The average household size was 2.19 and the average family size was 2.84.

The median age in the city was 44.4 years. 23.4% of residents were under the age of 18; 6.1% were between the ages of 18 and 24; 21.2% were from 25 to 44; 25.9% were from 45 to 64; and 23.4% were 65 years of age or older. The gender makeup of the city was 47.7% male and 52.3% female.

2000 census
As of the census of 2000, there were 4,671 people, 2,008 households, and 1,218 families living in the city. The population density was 1,784.9 people per square mile (688.4/km). There were 2,271 housing units at an average density of 867.8 per square mile (334.7/km). The racial makeup of the city was 95.20% White, 0.13% African American, 2.33% Native American, 0.21% Asian, 0.26% from other races, and 1.86% from two or more races. Hispanic or Latino of any race were 0.88% of the population.

There were 2,008 households, out of which 28.5% had children under the age of 18 living with them, 48.2% were married couples living together, 8.9% had a female householder with no husband present, and 39.3% were non-families. 35.7% of all households were made up of individuals, and 21.0% had someone living alone who was 65 years of age or older. The average household size was 2.25 and the average family size was 2.91.

In the city, the population was spread out, with 24.8% under the age of 18, 6.3% from 18 to 24, 23.2% from 25 to 44, 21.5% from 45 to 64, and 24.2% who were 65 years of age or older. The median age was 42 years. For every 100 females, there were 87.1 males. For every 100 females age 18 and over, there were 81.0 males.

As of 2000 the median income for a household in the city was $26,773, and the median income for a family was $40,523. Males had a median income of $26,908 versus $17,482 for females. The per capita income for the city was $17,254. About 5.1% of families and 9.1% of the population were below the poverty line, including 9.2% of those under age 18 and 10.7% of those age 65 or over.

Government and infrastructure
In 2013 police recruits have training at the Nebraska Law Enforcement Training Center, which includes LGBT sensitivity training, of which The Brandon Teena Story is a part.

Education

Falls City's public school system is Falls City Public Schools. It consists of two elementary schools, a junior high school, and Falls City High School. Sacred Heart School, a Catholic institution, offers K–12 education.

Culture
In 2013 Randy Houser, the sheriff, argued that the area form of conservatism is "mind your own business, live your own life".

Religion
In 1997 Catholicism was the largest variant of Christianity in Falls City.

Notable people
Charlie Abbey, baseball player
David Abbot, magician and debunker
Jim Bethke, baseball player
Gil Dodds, American and world indoor record holder for the mile run in the 1940s, Sullivan Award recipient in 1943.
Elmer "Skip" Dundy, showman and promoter, helped create many world's fair attractions, Luna Park on Coney Island, and the New York Hippodrome  
Pee Wee Erwin, jazz musician
John Philip Falter, illustrator, Saturday Evening Post
Lloyd Hahn, Olympic runner
Dave Heineman, 39th governor of Nebraska
Patricia McGerr, American crime writer
John H. Morehead, 17th governor of Nebraska
Patricia S. Morehead, Nebraska state legislator and teacher
C. Frank Reavis, U.S. Representative for Nebraska
Arthur J. Weaver, 22nd governor of Nebraska
David Wiltse, mystery novelist & playwright

See also
 National Register of Historic Places listings in Richardson County, Nebraska
 Itha T. Krumme Memorial Arboretum

References

External links
 Falls City, official website
 Falls City Journal
 Falls City Public Schools
 Falls City Sacred Heart School

Cities in Nebraska
Cities in Richardson County, Nebraska
Populated places on the Underground Railroad
County seats in Nebraska
Populated places established in 1857
1857 establishments in Nebraska Territory